German Šlein (born 28 March 1996) is an Estonian professional footballer who plays as a midfielder for Estonian club Nõmme Kalju.

Career
Šlein joined Flora in the summer 2013. He was loaned out to Czech club FC Vysočina Jihlava for the 2018–19 season. Ahead of the 2019–20 season, he was loaned out to JK Trans Narva but after playing one game for the club in the Europa League qualification due to an injury and returned to FC Flora. A few days later, he joined Viljandi JK Tulevik on loan instead.

Honours

Club
Flora
Meistriliiga: 2015, 2017
Estonian Cup: 2015–16
Estonian Supercup: 2016

References

External links

1996 births
Living people
Footballers from Tallinn
Estonian footballers
Association football midfielders
Esiliiga players
Meistriliiga players
Czech National Football League players
FC Flora players
FC Vysočina Jihlava players
JK Narva Trans players
Viljandi JK Tulevik players
Estonia youth international footballers
Estonia under-21 international footballers
Estonian expatriate sportspeople in the Czech Republic
Expatriate footballers in the Czech Republic
Tallinna JK Legion players